Wembanyama is a surname. Notable people with the surname include:

 Félix Wembanyama (born 1973), Congolese long jumper
 Victor Wembanyama (born 2004), French basketball player

Kongo-language surnames
Surnames of the Democratic Republic of the Congo